Nicholas Navin is an American biologist, and the Grady Saunders Distinguished Professor at the University of Texas MD Anderson Cancer Center. Nicholas Navin has pioneered the  development of the first single cell sequencing methods for DNA 

Navin is the Director of the CPRIT Single Cell Genomics Center and the co-director of the Advanced Genomic Technologies Core and holds a dual appointment in the University's Department of Genetics and Department of Bioinformatics, and serves as a scientific advisor to the biotechnology company ZS Genetics. Navin's work focuses on single cell sequencing, oncogenomics, bioinformatics and the genome evolution in cancer. Navin worked under the tutelage of Michael Wigler at the Cold Spring Harbor Laboratory, where he helped to develop the first single-cell DNA sequencing method: single nucleus sequencing. This discovery played pivotal role in establishing the field of single-cell genomics.

Awards

2021  AACR Breakthrough in Basic Research Award

2021  AAAS Fellow

2020  Living Legend Award in Basic Research

2019  Finalist, Blavatnik Award in Life Sciences

2016  ACS Research Scholar

2016  Sabin Family Fellowship

2016  President's Achievement Award

2016  Faculty Scholar Award

2015  AAAS Wachtel Award

2014  Faculty Educator Award

2013  Wilson Stone Award

2013  T.C. Hsu Award

2012  Damon Runyon-Rachleff Innovation Award - Nadia's Gift Foundation

2010  Young Investigator Award, GT Magazine

2010  Abraham's Award

2009  T32 Fellowship NCI

2009  King & Miller Fellowship

2005  Lindsey-Goldberg Fellowship

References

Year of birth missing (living people)
Living people
21st-century American biologists
University of Texas Medical Branch faculty
University of Texas faculty
University of Texas MD Anderson Cancer Center faculty